Ashley Obrest is an American softball coach who currently a volunteer assistant coach at Boston University. She is the former head coach at Boston College and Colgate. Around August 8,2011 she announced as top coach of softball at Boston University

Coaching career

Colgate (2011)

Boston College (2012-2019)
On August 8, 2011, Ashley Obrest was announced as the new head coach of the Boston College softball program. On May 21, 2019, Obrest resigned as head coach of the Boston College softball program.

Boston University (2020-2021)
On December 17, 2019, Ashley Obrest was added as a volunteer assistant coach for the Boston University softball program.

Northern Kentucky University (2022-Present) 

On December 30, 2022, Ashley Obrest was named assitant coach for Northern Kentucky University softball.

Head coaching record

College

References

Living people
Female sports coaches
American softball coaches
Boston University Terriers softball coaches
Boston College Eagles softball coaches
Boston College Eagles softball players
Colgate Raiders softball coaches
Concordia Cougars softball coaches
Year of birth missing (living people)